3α-Mannobiose is a disaccharide composed of two mannose molecules connected by α(1→3) glycosidic bond.

References

Disaccharides